The 1991–92 Women's National League Cup was a football competition in England organised by the Women's Football Association (WFA). It was the first edition of the Women's National League Cup, now run by the Football Association (renamed the Women's Premier League Cup from 1994 to 2018).

The Cup included top-flight clubs from the 1991–92 WFA National League Premier Division but was won by a second-tier club, Arsenal, from the Southern Division.

Arsenal Ladies became the first English women's League Cup winners, the team's first major trophy. The final was held at Alt Park, Knowsley, on 24 May 1992. Arsenal defeated Millwall Lionesses 1–0, with a 28th-minute goal by Naz Ball.

Quarter final

Ties

*Millwall won 5–4 on penalties.

Semi final

Ties

Final

See also
 1992–93 WFA Women's National League Cup

References

External links
1991–92 Results at The Owl Soccer Historian

1991–92 in English women's football
FA Women's National League Cup
1991–92 domestic association football cups